Dávid Asztalos (born 9 May 1995) is a Hungarian football player who plays for Hódmezővásárhely.

International career
He was part of the Hungarian U-19 at the 2014 UEFA European Under-19 Championship.

Club statistics

Updated to games played as of 1 June 2014.

References

External links

1995 births
Living people
People from Cegléd
Hungarian footballers
Hungary youth international footballers
Association football defenders
MTK Budapest FC players
Paksi FC players
Ceglédi VSE footballers
Monori SE players
Kecskeméti TE players
Jászberényi SE footballers
Nemzeti Bajnokság I players
Nemzeti Bajnokság II players
Nemzeti Bajnokság III players
Sportspeople from Pest County